East Aurora is a village in Erie County, New York, United States, southeast of Buffalo. It lies in the eastern half of the town of Aurora. The village population was 5,998 per the 2020 census. It is part of the Buffalo–Niagara Falls Metropolitan Statistical Area. In 2015, East Aurora was rated the third-best town to raise a family in New York State by Niche. According to the National Council of Home Safety and Security, it is also among the safest places to live in New York State  (ranked 1st, 2018).

History 
The village was founded in 1804, and incorporated in 1874.

Prior to becoming President of the United States, Millard Fillmore lived in East Aurora with his wife Abigail from 1826 to 1830. The house he built there while practicing law in the beginning of his political career is currently maintained by the Aurora Historical Society. The 1825 structure is restored to that period and features some original Fillmore furniture of the era, as well as items from Fillmore's presidential years. The home is currently located at 24 Shearer Avenue in the village of East Aurora. 	

The founder of the Roycroft Movement, Elbert Hubbard, also lived there during the turn of the twentieth century. One of the town's most famous landmarks, the Roycroft Inn, was converted from the Hubbards' original print shop and opened as an inn in 1905 to accommodate the influx of famous visitors attracted by Hubbard's ideas as well as the books, Mission-style furniture and metalware produced by the 500 Roycroft artisans on the South Grove Street Roycroft campus. The Roycroft Campus was granted National Landmark Status in 1986. The Roycroft Inn was re-opened in June 1995 through the support of the Margaret L. Wendt Foundation. The inn was completely restored and is open to the public for dining and accommodations. The Elbert Hubbard Museum on Oakwood Avenue features an extensive collection of Roycroft books and Arts & Crafts pieces.

East Aurora is also the birthplace of and home to the corporate headquarters for Fisher-Price. From 1987 through 2007 the village and the Toy Town Museum (an independent non-profit organization located on the Fisher-Price campus) held the Toyfest Festival, which included the Toyfest parade featuring giant replicas of classic Fisher-Price toys. The three-day event was usually held at Hamlin Park and included an amusement park, circus-like attractions and a Fisher-Price play area where young children could play with a variety of toys.

The town was the home of the inaugural owner of the NHL franchise Buffalo Sabres, Seymour H. Knox III. The Knox Estates, now known as Knox Farm, is a  New York state park. It is located on the northwest edge of the village.

East Aurora is home to the corporate headquarters of Moog, Inc. Moog is a designer and manufacturer of motion and fluid controls and control systems for applications in aerospace, defense, industrial and medical devices. The company operates under three segments: aircraft controls, space and defense controls, and industrial systems.

The Millard Fillmore House, George and Gladys Scheidemantel House, and Roycroft Campus are listed on the National Register of Historic Places.  The Adams family were the first settlers to stay a winter in East Aurora in 1804 and the family farm still stands today on Olean Road.

Contemporary issues 
East Aurora was one of the first communities to successfully block a Walmart store, in 1995 and again in 1999. The act was led by a community group in an attempt to preserve the small town values, and help support privately owned businesses. Wegmans also attempted to come to East Aurora, but it was blocked by Tops, the only grocery store in East Aurora.

Geography 
East Aurora is located at  (42.766809, -78.617121).

Main Street in the village is U.S. Route 20A.

Points of interest 
Main Street in East Aurora is lined with a variety of specialty shops, restaurants, churches, municipal buildings and carefully preserved homes. Businesses include the Toy Loft (a local toy store), Vidler's (an old-fashioned five and dime store), Arriba Tortilla (one of the Town's Mexican eateries), and the Aurora Theatre, a 650-seat, big-screen cinema theatre with a classic, old-fashioned neon marquee. The East Aurora Advertiser, the community newspaper since 1872, has occupied its Main St. office for more than 100 years. On Riley Street sits the Healthy Zone rink which was created by the Aurora Ice Association. They have made gradual improvements to the outdoor facility since its inception, including a roof and a brand new warming lodge that was opened in November 2015. The rinks components such as the boards, glass and refrigeration system were purchased by the Aurora Ice Association and is the same equipment used in the 2008 NHL Winter Classic between the Buffalo Sabres and the Pittsburgh Penguins.

Demographics 

As of the census of 2000, there were 6,674 people, 2,596 households, and 1,728 families residing in the village. The population density was 2,653.8 people per square mile (1,026.5/km2). There were 2,729 housing units at an average density of 1,085.3 per square mile (419.8/km2).

There were 2,596 households, out of which 34.2% had children under the age of 18 living with them, 54.9% were married couples living together, 8.9% had a female householder with no husband present, and 33.4% were non-families. 30.0% of all households were made up of individuals, and 12.8% had someone living alone who was 65 years of age or older. The average household size was 2.44 and the average family size was 3.05.

In the village, the population was spread out, with 25.6% under the age of 18, 5.3% from 18 to 24, 27.6% from 25 to 44, 22.6% from 45 to 64, and 18.8% who were 65 years of age or older. The median age was 40 years. For every 100 females, there were 87.5 males. For every 100 females age 18 and over, there were 82.5 males. Since 2012, there has been a boost in families with very young children.

Schools 
Children living in the village of East Aurora attend Parkdale Elementary (grades K–4), East Aurora Middle School (grades 5–8), and East Aurora High School (grades 9-12). Children living in the Town of Aurora attend the same public schools, with the notable exception of children living on Highland Drive in the Town of Aurora who attend the Iroquois School District due to a decision made in the 1960s. Immaculate Conception Catholic School (grades K-8) is the parochial and the Mandala school, a school that incorporates democratic and hands-on learning, are the alternatives. Children from the ages of one through four can attend nursery school on the Fisher Price campus, at the Duck Duck Goose Childcare Center or at some of the churches in East Aurora. Another option is the East Aurora Montessori School for ages two through five. Children may also attend Sprouting Minds Montessori School which is a school for infants through sixth grade providing a full Montessori curriculum to children in preschool through sixth grade. Sprouting Minds Montessori is located in the Town of Aurora near the West Falls borderline. Although not in East Aurora, the Aurora Waldorf School is a nearby option in West Falls providing an alternative Waldorf education to children from infancy through eighth grade. 

In 2008 and 2009 additions and renovations totaling $24 million were made to the district's schools to address space and maintenance issues. Prior to 2009 students attended Parkdale Elementary in grades K–2, and Main Street Elementary for grades 3–8. Elements of the Roycroft style influenced the design of Parkdale Elementary's new entrance.

The district gained approval on January 25, 2011, to begin contracting a roof repair project at the high school that would take place over the summer of 2011. The project did not have any tax impact on the community as it used funds from the district's emergency building repair fund and New York State Building Aid. The work was scheduled to begin on June 27, 2011.

Notable people 
Randall James Bayer, botanist
Merritt C. Buxton, U.S. National Champion jockey
Christine Estabrook, actress
Margaret Evans Price, illustrator, co-founder of Fisher-Price
Abigail Fillmore, former First Lady of the United States
Millard Fillmore, 13th President of the United States of America
William Headline, former Washington bureau chief for CNN
Elbert Hubbard, writer, publisher, artist, philosopher, and founder of the Roycroft artist community; died aboard the sinking of the RMS Lusitania on May 7, 1915.
Jeremy Jacobs, owner of the Boston Bruins
Emily Janiga, Professional Hockey player for the NWHL Buffalo Beauts
Felix Spencer Keigh, musician
Seymour H. Knox III, original owner of the Buffalo Sabres
Joseph McKeen Morrow, Wisconsin state assemblyman
Henry H. Persons, banker, businessman, New York State Senator.
Irving Price, co-founder of Fisher-Price and former mayor of East Aurora
Helen Schelle, co-founder of Fisher-Price
James Schuyler, New York School poet, moved to East Aurora with his family when he was 15 (the town is the setting for two of his poems, "The Morning of the Poem" and "A Few Days")
Julie Byrne, singer-songwriter
Albert Sharpe, All-American college football player
Luke Tasker, CFL wide receiver
Joe Slade White, political strategist

Art
East Aurora has been home to a number of regional landscape painters, most notably Carl W. Illig (1910-1987), who grew up and lived in the village for nearly all of his life. He painted landscape scenes along Cazenovia Creek, and fields and hills around East Aurora, in all seasons. His paintings are found in many homes in the village and surrounding towns.

Economy
Astronics is based in East Aurora.

Cultural references
 In the Whit Stillman movie Metropolitan, Nick Smith (played by Chris Eigeman) says that he will soon be taking a train to East Aurora, where he will meet his "stepmother of untrammeled malevolence, quite possibly to be murdered."

 A Prince for Christmas was filmed in the village of East Aurora and premiered on the ION network on November 29, 2015.

 A Christmas in Vermont was filmed in the village of East Aurora and other locations entirely in western NY. It premiered on the ION network on November 27, 2016.

 Cold Brook was directed by William Fichtner was filmed in the village of East Aurora and other locations in Western NY. The movie was released October 15, 2018.

References

External links
 Village of East Aurora official website
 East Aurora Advertiser, local newspaper
 Greater East Aurora Chamber of Commerce
 East Aurora Union Free School District

Buffalo–Niagara Falls metropolitan area
Villages in New York (state)
Villages in Erie County, New York
Populated places established in 1804
1804 establishments in New York (state)